Type 63 may refer to:
 Type 63 (armoured personnel carrier) (YW531) 
 Type 63 self-propelled anti-aircraft gun
 Type 63 (tank)
 Type 63 mortar - 60 mm mortar
 Type 63 multiple rocket launcher - 107mm MRL
 Type 63 multiple rocket launcher -  130 mm MRL, similar to the Russian BM-14
 Type 63 assault rifle
 Type 63 Field gun, Origin Thailand.
 Type 63 rifle, North Korean version of the SKS rifle.